Podë is a village in Korçë County, southeastern Albania. It is located between Ersekë and Leskovik. Today, it is a depopulated village with only 11 houses. At the 2015 local government reform it became part of the municipality Kolonjë.

Notable people 
Zylyftar Poda, leader of the Albanian revolt of 1832–1833 against Ottoman Empire

References

Populated places in Kolonjë, Korçë
Villages in Korçë County